José Alfonso Dulanto Rencoret (born 4 December 1943) is a Chilean politician and civil engineer who served as minister during Ricardo Lagos' government (2000−2006).

Early life
Dulanto completed his primary and secondary studies at Saint George's College in Las Condes, an upper-middle-class neighborhood of Santiago, the capital of Chile. Later, he studied civil engineering at the Pontifical Catholic University of Chile (PUC), graduating in 1969.

Once he graduated, and thanks to a scholarship from the British Council, Dulanto lived in London, England for two years.

Career
Dulanto started working in mining in 1972 when he joined the state-owned Codelco. He then carried out some business projects related to the field, starting in 1980, in partnership with Alejandro Noemi –executive president of Codelco in the '90s–.

In 1995, Dulanto and the Callejas family - partners in Refimet - sold the Altonorte smelter to Noranda.

Independent pro-Christian Democracy (DC), in the Government of Ricardo Lagos, he was appointed mayor of the main mining region of Chile: Antofagasta (2000). Dulanto was evaluated as one of the best intendants of the government, so he was appointed as Ministry of Mining in 2002.

The most important events of his administration were the approval of a specific tax project –after an initial failure in the form of royalty– and a higher collection for copper, which reached historical price levels.

While he was a minister, he delegated his personal activities to his brother José Pablo. After his departure, together began to operate smaller copper and gold mines in the Coquimbo Region. The former Secretary of State also has an agricultural business, producing blueberries and cherries in Chillán for export to China and the United States, respectively.

Personal life
He is married to Carolina Torres Pascal, his second wife. He has five daughters.

References

External links
 

1943 births
Living people
Chilean people
Chilean civil engineers
Pontifical Catholic University of Chile alumni